
Gmina Morawica is an urban-rural gmina (administrative district) in Kielce County, Świętokrzyskie Voivodeship, in south-central Poland.

Villages
Gmina Morawica contains the villages and settlements of Bieleckie Młyny, Bilcza, Brudzów, Brzeziny, Chałupki, Chmielowice, Dębska Wola, Drochów Dolny, Drochów Górny, Dyminy-Granice, Kawczyn, Kuby-Młyny, Łabędziów, Lisów, Morawica, Nida, Obice, Piaseczna Górka, Podwole, Radomice Drugie, Radomice Pierwsze, Wola Morawicka, Zaborze and Zbrza.

Neighbouring gminas
Gmina Morawica is bordered by the city of Kielce and by the gminas of Chęciny, Chmielnik, Daleszyce, Kije, Pierzchnica, Sitkówka-Nowiny and Sobków.

References
 Polish official population figures 2006

Morawica
Kielce County